The 4.6×36 mm is a cartridge developed by Heckler & Koch for its experimental HK36 assault rifle of the 1970s. When the rifle was not taken into service by any military force, its ammunition was not used for any other weapon design. The main feature that set the bullet apart from its contemporaries was the use of a so-called "spoon tip" (German: Löffelspitz): the tip had a concave area on one side which was intended to make the bullet "tumble" after hitting a target, in order to give it greater stopping power than such a small, high-velocity bullet would otherwise have.

Development
In the 1970s, ammunition for military rifles saw a reduction in calibre, largely inspired by the American 5.56×45mm round used in the M16 assault rifle. In an effort to create a weapon with low recoil, low weight, a flat trajectory and a high chance of incapacitating its target, Heckler & Koch designed the HK36 rifle together with the 4.6×36 mm ammunition.

Cartridge Types
Two variants of the round were developed, one with a soft core and another with a hard core, the former being intended for use against personnel, the latter against hard targets and to penetrate cover. Both were full-metal-jacketed rounds, the soft-cored bullet having a lead core while that of the hard-cored bullet was made from tungsten carbide.

Gallery

Notes

Pistol and rifle cartridges
Military cartridges